Hebron School is a co-educational independent boarding school in the hill station known as Ooty, in Tamil Nadu, southern India. The school is operated by a Protestant Christian trust with the aim of providing education to the children of Christian workers and other families living in India, and other parts of Asia.

The school is non-denominational, and accepts students of all faiths and of none.

History
The school traces its origin to 1899 when a group of Protestant missionaries, who had come to the hills on vacation and were staying at Brooklands Christian Guest Home in nearby Coonoor, decided it would be of benefit to their children to live year round in the temperate, clean and relatively disease-free surroundings of the Nilgiri hills. Initially the school operated as a type of boarding house where children would stay, and either be home-educated in house or sent to one of the local schools. It was named Hebron School in 1902.

In February 1961, Lushington Boys School was started at Lushington Hall, Ooty – these premises had formerly been a hostel for boys from Breeks Memorial School. Hebron School, Lushington Hall's sister school for girls, was situated at the Silverdale campus in Coonoor, approximately 20 km away. As time progressed it was decided that co-education would be more beneficial to the children, and in 1974 the two schools were amalgamated, with the senior school at Lushington Hall, Ooty (the senior girls were housed separately at Selborne) and the junior school at Coonoor.  In 1977(?) the junior school moved to Ooty so that the whole school could be together. The Silverdale campus (often referred to as Hebron Coonoor or Titch Heb) was sold to Christian Mission Service and is now a children's home and industrial training institute.

Campus
The Ooty Government Botanical Gardens and the school share a common entrance. It is sometimes known as "Hebron International School", as it was at least for some time recognised by the European Council of International Schools (ECIS) and because there are students from over 25 nationalities studying at the school. 

The school is very small by Indian standards and consists of around 375 students.

The student body represents 26 countries and many cultural and religious backgrounds. 39% of present students are Indian and 61% are other nationalities. 90% of the students are boarders.

Many, but not all of students are Protestants. The school is not restricted to the children of Christian workers in India alone, but is open to those of Christian workers worldwide, with a special emphasis on Asia and Africa, as well as children of "business parents" based in India.

Academics
Students follow the British school system and study for IGCSEs, AS and A levels. These examinations are generally assessed by the CAIE and Edexcel education boards.

Residential care
There are 15 dormitories (or dorms), arranged vertically, i.e. by age and sex. All dorms are single-sex. All boys' dorms are on the Lushington campus along with the youngest girls' dorms (up to around 9/10 years of age). The girls' dorms (age 12 and upwards) are on the Selborne campus (about 1 km from Lushington), and girls travel to school by bus or on foot (older girls).

Activities

Music
Every year music students are eligible to be entered for the practical and theory ABRSM grade exams. Royal Schools of Music examiners from the United Kingdom conduct these exams at the school. In November 2006 12 students received distinctions and 25 received merits, in 2007 90 students were entered for exams and in 2008 73 students again received 12 distinctions and 25 merits. Several students also received the Majolly Rolling Trophy in Singing for the most outstanding musicians in south India and the Admiral Dawson Rolling Trophy for Stds 6–8 for the most promising musicians in South India.

Sport
Athletics (track and field), swimming, cross-country running, football (soccer), field and indoor hockey, cricket, volleyball, basketball, badminton, table tennis, tennis, squash, softball and touch rugby are all sports offered at the school.

Drama
The school's annual Drama Festival consists of students from Stds 7, 9, 11, 13 participating in the art of theatre. Often, inter-school competitions within the Nilgiris are held.

Christian activities
These are voluntary activities that include regular Bible Studies, retreats and youth fellowships that help students discover the faith.

Student Council
Students are encouraged to take up leadership roles that will not only serve as a means to benefit themselves but also to act as the role models of the students. There are two major student-run events during the academic year. There are also a significant amount of fund-raising activities during the year.

International Guest System

 Hebron School runs an International Guest (IG) system. The program takes on young people across the globe, primarily recently graduated students, and provides them with free lodging in exchange for their service. Usually IGs are responsible for helping in a particular dormitory and are given other subject related duties. IGs almost always commit to a single semester (6 months) in the school. 
 Senior persons occasionally join the system, but are more often referred to as 'Senior Volunteers' than IGs.

Administration
Mr. Timothy Wright has been appointed Principal. Senior Management and School Council serve as the main decision-making bodies.
 Ms. Julia Coombs is the Head of Junior School, Mr. Benjamin Sampler is the Head of Middle School, Mr. Benedict Medhurst is the Head of Senior School, Mr. Graham Twigger is the Head of A levels. Mrs. Ruth Jacob is Vice Principal for Student Welfare and Mrs. Dagmar Baron is Vice Principal for Academics.

Notable alumni

 Alastair Cutting (born 1960) – Archdeacon Alastair Cutting is a Church of England priest.
Karan Faridoon Bilimoria, Baron Bilimoria of Chelsea, CBE, DL (born 1961) — founder member and Chairman of Cobra Beer
 Kalki Koechlin (born 1983) – French-Indian Hindi film actress
 Serena Kern-Libera (born 1988) — Swiss-Indian singer and songwriter
 Pranav Mohanlal (born 1990) – Indian Malayalam film actor
 Gautham Karthik (born 1990) – Indian Tamil film actor
 Apoorva Elizabeth Mittra (born 1991) — Indian model
 Udanta Singh (born 1996) – Kumam Udanta Singh (उदान्ता सिंह) is an Indian professional footballer who plays primarily as a forward for both Bengaluru and the India national team. Moreover has studied in Hebron School for 3 years.

Leavers' Service Speakers
 2007 – Sir Richard Stagg KCMG, British diplomat, the then British High Commissioner to India

See also

 St. Joseph's Higher Secondary School, Ooty
 St. Joseph's Boys School, Coonoor
 Breeks Memorial School, Ooty
 The Laidlaw Memorial School and Junior College, Ketti, Ooty
 Lawrence School, Lovedale, Ooty
 Woodside School, Ooty
 Stanes Hr.Sec. School, Coonoor
 Good Shepherd International School, Ooty

References

External links 

 
 Alumni section
 Hebron Highlights 2006–2007

International schools in India
Schools in Colonial India
Cambridge schools in India
Christian schools in Tamil Nadu
Boarding schools in Tamil Nadu
Primary schools in Tamil Nadu
High schools and secondary schools in Tamil Nadu
Schools in Nilgiris district
Education in Ooty
Educational institutions established in 1899
1899 establishments in British India